Kieran Verden (born 6 November 1998) is an English rugby union player who competes for Bath in the Premiership Rugby.

Verden was an impressive force in 2016/17 season captaining the Bath Academy throughout the year. His performances throughout the season saw him rewarded with a place in the England U18 squad for their summer tour of South Africa. He made his first-team debut against Worcester Warriors in a 40-15 victory in the Premiership competition.

On 11 December 2020, Verden joined Warriors on a short-term loan deal as injury cover. He played twice against Pau and Ospreys in the European Rugby Challenge Cup.

On 22 June 2021, Verden signed his first professional contract to stay with Bath at The Recreation Ground, thus promoted to the senior squad from the 2021-22 season.

References

External links
Bath Rugby Profile
ESPN Profile
Its Rugby Profile

1998 births
Living people
People educated at Beechen Cliff School
English rugby union players
Bath Rugby players
Rugby union players from Taunton
Rugby union props